For the 1982 Vuelta a España, the field consisted of 100 riders; 76 finished the race.

By rider

By nationality

References

1982 Vuelta a España
1982